Annemette Kure Andersen (born 1962) is a Danish poet and literary editor. Her poetry has been translated into several languages including English.

Biography
Born in Ribe, Andersen matriculated from Ribe Cathedral School in 1981. She went on to study Italian literature at Aarhus University and Siena University, graduating in Italian poetry in 1990. She worke d as a critic and translator, and was a freelance publisher’s reader. In 1996, she became editor of Hvedekorn, an important Danish literary journal.

After her debut with Dicentra Spectabilis in 1991, she translated poems by Giuseppe Ungaretti into Danish. Her own symbolist poetry is suggestive, evoking nature and hardly imperceptible mood changes in human relationships. Some of her poetry have been translated into English by the American poet Thom Satterlee (born 1967).

Works
Annemette Kure Andersen's works include:

 Dicentra Spectabilis (poems), Borgen (1991)
 Espalier (poems), Borgen (1993)
 Tidehverv (poems), Borgen (1996)
 Epifanier (poems), Borgen (1997)
 Fraktur (poems), Borgen (2000)
 Dokument (poems), Borgen (2001)
 Små Afvigelser (short stories), Borgen (2003)
 Vandskel (poems), Borgen (2005)
 Andetsteds (poems), Borgen (2007)
 Stedfæstelse (poems), Lindhardt & Ringhof 2012

References

1962 births
Living people
People from Ribe
Danish women poets
20th-century Danish translators
21st-century Danish translators
20th-century Danish poets
21st-century Danish poets
20th-century Danish women writers
21st-century Danish women writers